Pseudamnicola pisolinus is a species of mollusc in the genus Pseudamnicola.

This is a taxon inquirendum.

References

 Bank, R. A.; Neubert, E. (2017). Checklist of the land and freshwater Gastropoda of Europe. Last update: July 16th, 2017

External links
 Boeters, H. D. & Falkner, G. (2017). The genus Mercuria Boeters, 1971 in France (Gastropoda: Caenogastropoda: Hydrobiidae). West-European Hydrobiidae, Part 13. Zoosystema. 39 (2): 227-261

Hydrobiidae